Stories and Alibis is the debut studio album released by Matchbook Romance in 2003 on Epitaph Records.

Background
Pre-production was held at Mets Studio Rehearsal in North Hollywood, California. Joe Barresi produced and engineered the album, while additional production was done on "The Greatest Fall" by Epitaph Records owner Brett Gurewitz. Pete Martinez acted as an assistant engineer and did additional editing at Sound City Studios in Los Angeles, California, while Jeff Moses was the assistant engineer at Larrabee East Studio in North Hollywood. John Naclerio recorded the vocals for "The Greatest Fall" at Nada Studios in New Windsor, New York. "Playing for Keeps", "Promise" and "She'll Never Understand" were mixed at Larrabee East by Barresi. Gene Grimaldi then mastered the album at Oasis Mastering.

Track listing
All songs written by Matchbook Romance, all lyrics written by Andrew Jordan.

"Introduction" – 1:34
"Your Stories, My Alibis" – 4:46
"Playing for Keeps" – 3:45
"Promise" – 4:16
"Lovers & Liars" – 3:21
"Tiger Lily" – 3:03
"Shadows Like Statues" – 4:29
"My Eyes Burn" – 4:19
"She'll Never Understand" – 3:58
"If All Else Fails" – 5:47
"Stay Tonight" – 3:22
"The Greatest Fall" – 4:04
Untitled (hidden track) – 3:07

Tracks 13–83 each have five seconds of silence; the hidden track is played at track number 84''
The title of track 12 differences in the liner notes: the credits page lists it as "The Greatest Fall (Of All Time)"; the penultimate page lists it as "The Greatest Fall of All Time"; and the back of the booklet lists it as "The Greatest Fall".

Charts
Album - Billboard (United States)

Personnel
Personnel per booklet.

Matchbook Romance
 Andrew Jordan – vocals, guitar
 Ryan "Judas" DePaolo – guitar, vocals
 Ryan Kienle – bass guitar, vocals
 Aaron Stern – drums

Additional musicians
 David Palmer – keyboards

Production and design
 Joe Barresi – producer, engineer and mixing
 Pete Martinez – assistant engineer, additional editing
 Jeff Moses – assistant engineer
 Brett Gurewitz – additional production (track 12)
 John Naclerio – vocal recording (track 12)
 Gene Grimaldi – mastering
 Bob Lenz – art direction, design
 Matt Govaere – art direction, design

References

2003 debut albums
Matchbook Romance albums
Epitaph Records albums
Albums produced by Joe Barresi